Asterius, Claudius and Neon were a group of brothers, who suffered martyrdom. During the persecutions of Diocletian, the three brothers were handed over to the proconsul of Cilicia, Lysias. Martyred along with them were two women, Domnina and Theonilla a widow.

Butler's account

The hagiographer Alban Butler (1710–1773) wrote in his Lives of the Fathers, Martyrs, and Other Principal Saints under August 23,

References

Sources

 

303 deaths
Saints from Roman Anatolia
4th-century Christian martyrs
4th-century Romans
Year of birth unknown
Groups of Christian martyrs of the Roman era